SM UB-112 was a German Type UB III submarine or U-boat in the German Imperial Navy during World War I. She was commissioned into the German Imperial Navy on 16 April 1918 as SM UB-112.

UB-112 was surrendered to the Allies at Harwich on 24 November 1918 in accordance with the requirements of the Armistice with Germany; she was used for explosives trials off Falmouth on 20 November and 1 December 1920, after which the boat was dumped on Castle Beach. The wreck was sold for scrap to R. Roskelly & Rodgers on 19 April 1921 for £125, but remains survive in situ.

Construction

She was built by Blohm & Voss of Hamburg and following just under a year of construction, launched at Hamburg on 15 September 1917. UB-112 was commissioned in the spring the next year under the command of Kptlt. Wilhelm Rhein. Like all Type UB III submarines, UB-112 carried 10 torpedoes and was armed with a  deck gun. UB-112 had a displacement of  while surfaced and  when submerged. Her engines enabled her to travel at  when surfaced and  when submerged.

Summary of raiding history

References

Notes

Citations

Bibliography 

 

German Type UB III submarines
World War I submarines of Germany
U-boats commissioned in 1918
1917 ships
Ships built in Hamburg